Eskene (Eskene, ەسكەنە), also known as Iskininskiy (Iskininskiy) is a town in Atyrau Region, southwest Kazakhstan.

References

Atyrau Region
Cities and towns in Kazakhstan